Holcosus leptophrys, also known commonly as the delicate ameiva and the delicate whiptail, is a species of lizard in the family Teiidae. The species is native to Central America and northwestern South America.

Geographic range
H. lepyophrys is found in Colombia, Costa Rica, and Panama.

Description
H. leptophrys is brown-coloured, with bark-brown zig-zag lines running down each side.

References

External links

Ameiva leptophrys, WildHerps.net
Ameiva leptophrys, Cliff Bernzweig
 Ameiva leptophrys, CalPhotos

leptophrys
Reptiles of Colombia
Reptiles of Costa Rica
Reptiles of Panama
Reptiles described in 1893
Taxa named by Edward Drinker Cope